David Boswell (born 1953) is a Canadian comic book writer and artist.

David or Dave Boswell may also refer to:
 Dave Boswell (baseball) (1945–2012), American right-handed pitcher
 F. David Boswell (born 1956), Canadian computer scientist, awarded the J.W. Graham Medal in 2003
 David Boswell (Kentucky politician) (born 1949), former Democratic member of the Kentucky Senate
David Boswell, British musician in Hiem